Have 'Twangy' Guitar Will Travel is the debut album by the guitarist Duane Eddy. It was released in 1958 on Jamie Records, as JLP-3000. There were five charting singles and a B-side of an additional charting single taken from this album.

Jamie Records released the album again in 1999 on compact disc, as Jamie 4007-2, with three bonus tracks. The bonus tracks are, in order, "Up and Down", "The Walker" and "Mason Dixon Lion".

Background
After releasing a couple of successful singles, Eddy released his first album, Have 'Twangy' Guitar Will Travel  on January 9, 1958. It is a mix of early rock & roll, swing, country and blues, and contains several covers as well as original compositions. He and the band known as The Rebels — Al Casey on rhythm guitar, his wife Corki Casey also on rhythm guitar, Steve Douglas on saxophone, Buddy Wheeler on bass guitar, Mike Bermani and Bob Taylor on drums — who along with several guest musicians were joined by The Sharps (later known as The Rivingtons), who contributed non-lyrical vocals, whoops and hollers. The album spent 82 weeks on the Billboard charts during 1959-1960, reaching a high of #5. Five singles released both before and after the album was released, charted in the Billboard Hot 100. Eddy would go on to release nine more charting albums and 26 more charting singles in the next five years.

Critical reception
MusicHound Rock: The Essential Album Guide called the album "one of the keystones of modern rock guitar."

Track listing 
All songs written by Duane Eddy and Lee Hazlewood unless noted.
"Lonesome Road" (Gene Austin, Nathaniel Shilkret) — 3:09 
"I Almost Lost My Mind" (Ivory Joe Hunter) — 2:18 
"Rebel Rouser" — 2:23
"Three-30-Blues" - 3:33
"Cannonball" — 1:55
"The Lonely One" — 1:42
"Detour" (Paul Westmoreland) — 2:12 
"Stalkin'" — 2:27
"Ramrod" (Al Casey) — 1:42 
"Anytime" (Herbert "Happy" Lawson) — 2:19 
"Moovin' 'N' Groovin'" — 2:05
"Loving You" (Jerry Leiber, Mike Stoller) — 2:10

Personnel

The Rebels
Duane Eddy — guitar
Al Casey — electric bass, piano, rhythm guitar
Steve Douglas — saxophone
Corki Casey O'Dell — rhythm guitar
Buddy Wheeler — electric bass
Bob Taylor — drums
Mike Bermani — drums

Guest musicians
Plas Johnson — saxophone
Gil Bernal — saxophone
Ike Clanton — bass guitar
Jimmy Simmons — upright bass
Jimmy Wilcox — bass guitar
Donnie Owens — rhythm guitar
The Sharps — backing vocals

Technical
Lee Hazlewood — producer
Lester Sill — producer
Jack Miller — engineer
Eddie Brackett — engineer
Greg Vaughn — mastering
Tom Moulton — mastering
Ben Demotto — liner notes

Chart positions

Singles

References

External links
Have Twangy Guitar Will Travel
Duane Eddy | Way Back Attack

Duane Eddy albums
1958 debut albums
Jamie Records albums
Albums produced by Lee Hazlewood
Albums produced by Lester Sill